William Gibson was Dean of Ferns from 1932 until 1936. Gibson was educated  at the Royal University of Ireland and ordained in 1893. After a curacy at Saint Martin, Jersey, he became the incumbent at Ballycarney. After this he was Vicar of Adamstown then Rector of New Ross until his appointment as dean.

References

Alumni of the Royal University of Ireland
Deans of Ferns